Patrick Beech is a retired Jamaican association football forward who played professionally in Jamaica and the United States.

Beech began his career in Jamaica, playing for Olympic Gardens in the National Premier League.  In 1998, Beech moved to the United States where he joined the Seattle Sounders of the USISL A-League.  In 1999, he played for the New Orleans Riverboat Gamblers, the Atlanta Silverbacks in 2000 and the Connecticut Wolves in 2001.  After a disappointing 2001 season with Connecticut, scoring only one goal, Beech returned to Jamaica in November and signed with Rivoli United F.C.  In March 2003, Beech moved from Rivoli United to Arnett Gardens F.C.  In 2004, he returned to Rivoli United.  In January 2009, Beech played for Duhaney Park.

References

External links

Living people
1974 births
Sportspeople from Kingston, Jamaica
Arnett Gardens F.C. players
Atlanta Silverbacks players
Connecticut Wolves players
Jamaican footballers
Jamaican expatriate footballers
Seattle Sounders (1994–2008) players
New Orleans Riverboat Gamblers players
Rivoli United F.C. players
A-League (1995–2004) players
Jamaica international footballers
Expatriate soccer players in the United States
Jamaican expatriate sportspeople in the United States
Association football forwards